Ovasaray can refer to:

 Ovasaray, Amasya
 Ovasaray, Çorum